Cerlapirdine (USAN; SAM-531, WAY-262,531, PF-05212365) is a drug which was under development by Wyeth/Pfizer for the treatment of cognitive disorders associated with Alzheimer's disease and schizophrenia. In a phase II clinical trial it demonstrated a trend toward efficacy along with a good side effect profile and no incidence of serious adverse events, but no further development has occurred since 2011.

It exerts its effects by acting as a selective 5-HT6 receptor antagonist.

See also 
 Idalopirdine
 Latrepirdine

References 

Dimethylamino compounds
Abandoned drugs
1-Naphthyl compounds